Banknotes were issued by the Swakopmund Bookshop (German; Swakopmunder Buchhandlung) between 1916 and 1918 as an emergency currency. They issued 10, 25, 50 Pfennig, and 1, 2, and 3 mark notes. Although these were issued under South African administration, these notes are denominated in Pfennig and Mark, which was the South West African mark as opposed to the German South West African Mark. Despite this, these are genuine British Empire and Commonwealth issues.

These notes are known as 'Gutschein'. These notes are wrongly listed in the Standard Catalog of World Paper Money (which is published by Krause Publications) under 'German South-West Africa'.

References

Notes

Literature

See also

South West African banknote issuers

Swakopmund Bookshop
Currencies of Namibia
Swakopmund